The Muscle Shoals Recordings is an album by The SteelDrivers. It was released on Rounder Records on June 16, 2015. It earned the group a Grammy Award for Best Bluegrass Album.

Critical reception

Mark Deming of AllMusic concludes his review with, "the music speaks for itself, and what it says is eloquent and deeply pleasing."

Hal Horowitz of American Songwriter writes, "The album’s title implies a wider expansion of the SteelDrivers’ already elastic sound that doesn't appear, yet the group has rarely sounded more focused or passionate. That makes The Muscle Shoals Recordings another notable entry into the group's already distinctive catalog."

Jonathan Frahm of PopMatters concludes his review with, "not unlike John Henry, they’re fighting an uphill battle against the digitization of the industry, with their bare hands and organic instrumentation as their only weapons. They do it so darn well that they might just win."

Kelly McCartney of Folk Alley writes, "It's a thoroughly supple, occasionally somber set, but even the darker hues have a fluidity that keep them from getting too bogged down in their own self-importance."

Michael McDade of No Depression says, "This album really puts The Steeldrivers back on the map. They’ve got their great songs about people doing bad things, but now they’ve mixed that with having a great understanding what their lead man’s strengths are as a singer."

Chuck Dauphin of Billboard writes, "The band has just released their second disc with Nichols -- The Muscle Shoals Recordings -- which debuted at No. 1 on the Billboard Bluegrass Albums chart last week. He (Gary Nichols) said the album has the potential to be very special for the group."

Donald Teplyske of Country Standard Time begins his review with, "The SteelDrivers are a dynamic, driving bluegrass band, a five-piece with a sound and an approach completely their own."

Track listing

Chart performance

Credits and personnel
Musicians
Tammy Rogers – Fiddle, Viola, Vocals
Gary Nichols – Acoustic Guitar, Baritone Guitar (6-String), Baritone Guitar (8-String), Vocals
Richard Bailey – Banjo
Mike Fleming – Bass, Vocals
Brent Truitt – Mandolin
Jason Isbell – Slide Guitar (Tracks 3, 8)

Production
Producer – The SteelDrivers
Producer – Jason Isbell (Tracks 5, 8)
Additional Engineering and Editing – Chris Latham
Assistant Editing And Mixing Engineer – Gary Nichols
Assistant Engineer – Cody Simmons
Recorded By, Mixed By – Jimmy Nutt
Mastered By – Paul Blakemore
Photography – Robert Rausch
Cover Design – Jimmy Hole
Package Design – Carrie Smith
Booking – Conway Entertainment
Liner Notes – Peter Cooper
Artist Representation/Management – Wortman Works

Track information and credits verified from the album's liner notes. Some credits adapted from Discogs.

References

External links
The SteelDrivers Official Site

2015 albums
Grammy Award for Best Bluegrass Album
Rounder Records albums
The SteelDrivers albums